Jan Jiří Benda, also Johann Georg Benda (baptized 16 April or 30 August 1713 – 1752), was a Bohemian violinist and composer active in Germany.

Life

Johann Georg Benda was born in Benátky nad Jizerou, the son of a weaver, Jan Jiří Benda and his wife Dorota Brixi, daughter of the village cantor from Slasko and member of the large Czech musical family. He was the second oldest of five brothers, four of whom achieved success as violinists and composers, Franz Benda, Georg Anton Benda and Joseph Benda. His younger sister Anna Franziska Benda became an operatic soprano.

In 1733, Johann Georg followed his older brother Franz into the employment of the Hofkapelle at Dresden. Once again following in his brother's footsteps, Johann Georg moved to Rheinsberg in 1734 and, arriving on or after 8 April, was immediately employed as a viola player in the then-crown prince Frederick's private Hofkapelle. During this time, he also finalised his training as a violinist under the tutelage of his older brother, Franz. Upon the accession of Frederick to the Prussian throne in 1740, Johann Georg was transferred to Berlin where he was employed in the newly formed court orchestra, first as a viola player on a salary of 150 Thaler, and later as a violinist on a salary of 300 Thaler. He died in Berlin in early 1752.

Works 
 Concerto in F major for violin, strings and continuo, LorB 279
 Concerto in F major for violin, strings and continuo, LorB 277
 Concerto in D minor for violin, strings and continuo (lost)
 Trio Sonata in C major for flute, violin and continuo, LorB 275
 Sonata for violin and continuo in C minor
 11 Sonatas for flute and continuo, LorB 253-262, 264
 7 Duets for 2 violins, LorB 265-270, 272

See also 
 Benda (surname)
 Benda

References

External links
 

1713 births
1752 deaths
18th-century classical composers
18th-century Bohemian musicians
Czech Baroque composers
Czech male classical composers
Czech classical violinists
Czech expatriates in Germany
German classical composers
German male classical composers
German classical violinists
Male classical violinists
German violinists
German male violinists
People from Benátky nad Jizerou
18th-century German composers
18th-century German male musicians